Millbrook, also known as Chalfont,  is a neighborhood in the Northeast section of Philadelphia, Pennsylvania, United States. The neighborhood is adjacent to Franklin Mills. The neighborhood consists of row homes, twin and twin rancher homes and has subdivision names such as Robindale, Chalfont, and the DiMarco Homes. The neighborhoods were constructed between 1956 and 1962, with newer areas near the Poquessing Creek built after 1970-1975. There were several Polish family farmettes, including Stopyra, Bushel, Strezlecki, Wyszynski and Grabowski occupying much of this area prior to the subdivision's construction. The neighborhood parish and Roman Catholic School is Our Lady of Calvary, located at 11024 Knights Road and Aloysius Fitzpatrick Elementary Public School is on the northeast corner of Knights Road and Chalfont Drive. Millbrook is also home to a magnet school specializing in the performing arts, The Arts Academy at Benjamin Rush. 

Neighborhoods in Philadelphia
Northeast Philadelphia